The Fly Club is a final club, traditionally "punching" (inviting to stand for election) male undergraduates of Harvard College during their sophomore or junior year.  Undergraduate and graduate members participate in club activities.

Founded 1836 as a literary society by the editors of Harvardiana, the club was granted a charter by the Alpha Delta Phi fraternity in 1837 and remained a chapter until surrendering its charter in 1865. With the graduation of the members of the class of 1868, the club was discontinued until 1878, when graduate members, including Edward Everett Hale (class of 1839) and Phillips Brooks (class of 1855), initiated undergraduates from the class of 1879, to whom the old charter was restored. In 1906, the charter was once again surrendered, and in 1910, the organization officially adopted the name "Fly Club," its unofficial title since 1885. In 1996, the Fly Club merged with the DU Club, another final club, and the combined entity retained the name "Fly Club."  

Some sources maintain that the club's name was derived by combining the PH from "Alpha," the l from "Delta," and the i from "Phi," to get "Phli," pronounced "Fly".

The club motto, suggested by Prof. Morris H. Morgan (class of 1881) and adopted Feb. 1902, reads DURATURIS HAUD DURIS VINCULIS, an ablative absolute construction translated as "Bonds should be lasting, not chafing or hard."

Clubhouse
Constructed in 1896, with brick facade added in 1902, the Fly clubhouse is located at Two Holyoke Place, near Harvard Square, along the "Gold Coast" of formerly private residences that now comprise Harvard's Adams House (completed 1932) The Fly sits in front of Harvard's Lowell House (1930), across Mt. Auburn St. from the Harvard Lampoon building (1909).

Fly Club Gate 
The Fly Club Gate is located along the exterior of Winthrop House. An English Baroque structure, the gate was built in 1914 by a grant from members of the Fly Club. The Fly's symbol, a "leopard rampant gardant" (known as the "Kitty"), is centered within the ironwork above the entry. Inscribed below is a dedication: "For Friendships Made in College the Fly Club in Gratitude has Built this Gate."

Notable members

Academia
James Bryant Conant* – 26th President of Harvard University
Abbott Lawrence Lowell – historian, 25th President of Harvard University
Charles William Eliot – 24th President of Harvard University
Archibald Cary Coolidge – historian, Harvard professor, first director of the Harvard University Library

Public service
Franklin Delano Roosevelt – 32nd President of the United States
Theodore Roosevelt – 26th President of the United States
Oliver Wendell Holmes, Jr. – Supreme Court Justice
Jay Rockefeller – U.S. Senator from West Virginia
James Roosevelt – son of Franklin Roosevelt, U.S. Congressman (CA)
Deval Patrick – 71st Governor of Massachusetts
William Weld – 68th Governor of MassachusettsDonald Trump
Tony Lake – President Bill Clinton's National Security Advisor
Jared Kushner – son-in-law of President Donald Trump; Senior White House Adviser and head of the White House Office of American Innovation
Joseph Clark Grew – career diplomat, U.S. Ambassador to Japan 1932–1941, oversaw development of US Foreign Service
Charles Francis Adams III – skipper of America's Cup defender Resolute, 1920; inductee, America's Cup Hall of Fame; Secretary of the Navy, 1929–1932

Religion
Edward Everett Hale – author, historian, Unitarian minister, Chaplain to the U.S. Senate
Phillips Brooks – clergyman, author, lyricist

The arts
James Russell Lowell – poet, critic, editor, and diplomat
Ernest Lawrence Thayer – author of "Casey at the Bat"
Owen Wister – American writer, "father" of western fiction 
Robert Charles Benchley* – American humorist
Evan Thomas – American journalist and author
Robert Carlock – writer, producer
Whit Stillman – writer, film director
Frederick Hubbard Gwynne – stage, film, and television actor
Francis Higginson Cabot – gardener, horticulturist, founder of the Garden Conservancy, creator of Stonecrop and Les Quatre Vents, a founder of Harvard Krokodiloes
Herbert Dudley Hale – son of Edward Everett Hale; noted Boston and NYC architect, architect of the Fly's clubhouse at Two Holyoke Place.

Finance and business
Albert Hamilton Gordon* – Wall Street entrepreneur, Chairman of Kidder Peabody
David Rockefeller* – American banker 
Louis Kane* – founder of Au Bon Pain bakery and café
Charlie Cheever – co-founder of Quora

Athletics
W. Palmer Dixon – first recipient of major "H" in squash, two-time winner of national squash championship (1925, 1926), donor of Harvard University's W. Palmer Dixon Indoor Tennis Courts

Scholarships In Memoriam 
Caspar Henry Burton, Jr. – during WWI, volunteered for British Red Cross; enlisted Royal Fusiliers, British Army; gazetted 4th Battalion, King's (Liverpool) Regiment; transferred to American Army, A.E.F.. Died of wounds received in battle. A Harvard University scholarship is named in his honor. 
Lionel de Jersey Harvard* – first [collateral] descendant of John Harvard to attend Harvard College, casualty of WWI. Harvard College's Harvard-Cambridge Fellowship (to Emmanuel College) is named in his honor.
Michael Clark Rockefeller – amateur anthropologist, disappeared in 1961 during an expedition in the Asmat region of southwestern Netherlands New Guinea. Harvard College's Michael C. Rockefeller Traveling Fellowship is named in his honor.

* Initiated into the D.U. Club, which merged with the Fly Club in 1996.

References

Harvard University
1836 establishments in Massachusetts